People and Justice (abbreviated NiP) is a centre-right political party in Bosnia and Herzegovina. The party was founded on 12 March 2018.

History
People and Justice was founded on 12 March 2018, after Elmedin Konaković resigned from all party functions in the conservative Bosniak Party of Democratic Action. The founding assembly was held on the same day, in the presence of 60 founders, where Konaković was elected president, Senada Bosno and Elvedin Okerić vice presidents and Mirza Selimbegović was elected Secretary General.

In the general election held in the same year, the party won six seats in the Sarajevo Cantonal Assembly, two seats in the Federal House of Representatives and one seat in the Federal House of Peoples. In the 2020 municipal elections the party significantly increased its share of votes in the city of Sarajevo, becoming the largest political party in the city.

In the 2022 general election, the party also significantly increased its share of votes in the country, winning three seats in the national House of Representatives and seven seats in the Federal one. Following the election, a coalition led by the Alliance of Independent Social Democrats, the Croatian Democratic Union and the Social Democratic Party, including People and Justice, reached an agreement on the formation of a new government.

List of presidents

Elections

Parliamentary elections

Cantonal elections

References

External links
Official Website

Liberal parties in Bosnia and Herzegovina
Pro-European political parties in Bosnia and Herzegovina
Conservative parties in Bosnia and Herzegovina
Political parties established in 2018
Bosniak political parties in Bosnia and Herzegovina